Mildred Pierce is an American drama television miniseries that aired on HBO from March 27 to April 10, 2011, consisting of five episodes. Adapted from James M. Cain's 1941 novel of the same name, it was directed by Todd Haynes, and starred Kate Winslet in the title role, alongside Guy Pearce, Evan Rachel Wood, and Melissa Leo. Carter Burwell wrote the original score for the miniseries.

It is the second adaptation of the novel, after the 1945 film noir produced by Warner Bros. and starring Joan Crawford.

Synopsis 

Mildred Pierce depicts an overprotective, self-sacrificing mother during the Great Depression who finds herself separated from her husband, opening a restaurant of her own and falling in love with a man, all the while trying to earn her spoiled, narcissistic elder daughter's love and respect.

Cast 
 Kate Winslet as Mildred Pierce
 Guy Pearce as Monty Beragon
 Evan Rachel Wood as Veda Pierce (Dilber Yunus and Sumi Jo as her singing "voice")
 Miriam Shor as Anna
 Melissa Leo as Lucy Gessler
 Morgan Turner as Young Veda Pierce
 James LeGros as Wally Burgan
 Brían F. O'Byrne as Bert Pierce
 Mare Winningham as Ida Corwin
 Hope Davis as Mrs. Forrester
 Quinn McColgan as Ray Pierce
 Waltrudis Buck as Mrs. Temple

Filming 
Parts of the miniseries were filmed in three New York locations: Peekskill, Point Lookout and Merrick.

Reception 

Mildred Pierce received generally favorable reviews. On Rotten Tomatoes it has an approval rating of 81% based on reviews from 58 critics. At Metacritic, the miniseries has a  weighted average score of 69, based on 28 reviews, which indicates "generally favorable reviews". In a WBEZ podcast on the best theatrical films of 2011, critic Jonathan Rosenbaum used the series as an example of television work that was on par with the year's best movies, calling it Haynes' best work to date. Salon.com called it a "quiet, heartbreaking masterpiece", while The New York Times reviewer, Alessandra Stanley, commented that while the miniseries was "loyally, unwaveringly true to James M. Cain's 1941 novel", it did not "make the most of the mythic clash of mother, lover and ungrateful child", and was "not nearly as satisfying as the 1945 film noir".

Novelist Stephen King, reviewing Mildred Pierce for The Daily Beast and Newsweek, praised the acting of Winslet, Pearce and Wood, and admired the show's attention to detail and structure, but complained that the five-hour adaptation was "too damn long". He finishes with, "Winslet’s Mildred is a genuine star turn. How Joan Crawford would have loathed her."

The series was shown out of competition at the 68th Venice International Film Festival in 2011.

Ratings

Awards and nominations

Notes

References

External links
 
 

2010s American drama television miniseries
2011 American television series debuts
2011 American television series endings
Great Depression television series
HBO original programming
Primetime Emmy Award-winning television series
Television series set in the 1930s
Television shows based on American novels
Television shows filmed in New York (state)
Television shows set in Glendale, California